Giovanni Bonalino (c. 1575 – 1633, in Bamberg) was an Italian builder and mason, who worked primarily in Germany. He worked on several churches in Bamberg, the  Schloss Ehrenburg in Coburg, the Pfarrhaus in Frensdorf, and the Schloss in Weimar. He began designing the palace in Weimar in 1619 following a fire in 1774.

References

17th-century Italian architects
Italian stonemasons
1633 deaths
Italian expatriates in Germany
Year of birth uncertain